Francis Willoughby may refer to:

 Francis Willoughby (1547–1596), industrialist and coalowner
 Francis Willoughby (1613–1671), deputy governor of Massachusetts
 Francis Willughby (1635–1672), English ornithologist and ichthyologist
 Francis Willoughby, 2nd Baron Middleton (1692–1758), Old Etonian
 Francis Willoughby, 3rd Baron Middleton (1726–1774), English nobleman
 Francis Willoughby, 5th Baron Willoughby of Parham (1605–1666), Barbadian politician